Monastery of the Holy Mother of God in Ston was a Serbian Orthodox monastery located in Ston (present-day Croatia). It was the seat of the Serbian Orthodox Eparchy of Hum between 1219 and the 1250s. The first bishop of the eparchy, seated at the monastery, was Ilarion. Following an earthquake in the 1250s, the episcopal seat was transferred to the Church of Peter and Paul on the Lim river. Serbian Orthodox priests continued to serve in Ston up to 1333, when the region was ceded by mutual agreement to the Republic of Ragusa by Serbian King Stefan Dušan, under the condition of religious toleration, imposed upon the Republic.

References

Bibliography

 
 
 
 

Medieval Serbian Orthodox monasteries
History of the Serbian Orthodox Church in Croatia
Buildings and structures in Dubrovnik-Neretva County
History of Dalmatia